Darius Jeremy Pierce, better known as Shangela Laquifa Wadley or mononymously as Shangela (born November 22, 1980), is an American drag queen, reality television personality and actor best known for competing on RuPaul's Drag Race. Shangela was the first contestant eliminated in season two, and returned as a surprise contestant in the series' third season, placing fifth. She returned once again for the third season of RuPaul's Drag Race All Stars where she finished in joint-third/fourth place alongside winner of the first season, BeBe Zahara Benet. Shangela has also made several television appearances and regularly performs across the United States and Canada.

After Drag Race, Shangela appeared in numerous television series, including Community (2011), 2 Broke Girls (2012), Glee (2012), Bones (2014), The X-Files (2016), and Broad City (2019). She also appeared in the comedy film Hurricane Bianca (2016), its sequel Hurricane Bianca: From Russia with Hate (2018), and the musical drama film A Star is Born (2018). In 2019, representing A Star Is Born at the 91st Academy Awards, she became the first drag queen to walk the Oscars red carpet in drag. Since 2020, Shangela has co-hosted the HBO reality series We're Here, alongside fellow Drag Race contestants Bob the Drag Queen and Eureka O'Hara. The series has received acclaim from critics.

Early life
Pierce was born in Lamar, Texas and grew up in Paris, Texas, the only child of Debra Sue Pierce (born 1959), a worker in the United States Army who traveled frequently for her work. She is biracial, and is of half-Saudi descent. Her parents split when she was at a young age, and her father returned to his home region in Saudi Arabia, so Pierce was raised by her large Southern Baptist family, including a grandfather who worked as a cowboy on a cattle ranch. Her grandfather passed away in 2000. She was a male cheerleader in high school, and began dressing in drag for creative projects for English classes.

Career

Early career 
Shangela emerged as Pierce's drag persona in January 2009. Pierce had choreographed a three-person drag act to "Single Ladies" for a sober charity event in Los Angeles, and when one of the performers cancelled, the other two asked her to fill in. The club's promoter was so impressed with Shangela's performance that he offered to book her for the following week. In 2010, Shangela was crowned in the first California Entertainer of the Year pageant; the first alternate was Chad Michaels.

RuPaul's Drag Race 
After five months of performing in Los Angeles, Shangela was selected to join the cast for season two of RuPaul's Drag Race, but was eliminated in the first episode. She later reauditioned and was invited back for season three, where she made it to the top five (although she placed sixth overall due to the return of Carmen Carrera one episode later). She also made cameo appearances in the show's fourth-season premiere and the "Snatch Game" episode of All Stars season two.

Shangela returned to compete on the third season of RuPaul's Drag Race: All Stars, making her the first queen to compete on three separate seasons of the show. She made it to the season's finale and was considered a frontrunner for the crown, but was controversially eliminated after only receiving one vote from Thorgy Thor among the jury of previously eliminated queens. She subsequently tied third/fourth place with season-one winner Bebe Zahara Benet.

Shangela competed in the television special RuPaul's Drag Race Holi-slay Spectacular. In June 2019, a panel of judges from New York magazine placed Shangela second on their list of "the most powerful drag queens in America", a ranking of 100 former RuPaul's Drag Race contestants.

Other television and film appearances 

Shangela appeared in Toddlers & Tiaras, in which she coached her 9-year-old goddaughter to compete in a beauty pageant. Other appearances include episodes of Glee, Bones,  Community, Terriers, Dance Moms, 2 Broke Girls, Detroit 187 and The Mentalist, as well as a commercial for Orbitz with fellow Drag Race contestants Manila Luzon and Carmen Carrera. Shangela and other RuPaul's Drag race contestants including Trixie Mattel, Tammie Brown, and Manila Luzon, appeared in a Food and Drug Administration campaign against smoking.

Pierce had a non-drag role in a short film, Body of a Barbie (2011), which aired on BET and was a Top 7 National Finalist on the network's Lens on Talent series. In 2013, Shangela was featured in an ad for Facebook Home.

She was one of thirty drag queens featured in Miley Cyrus's 2015 VMA performance.

Shangela had a role in the 2016 comedy film Hurricane Bianca, directed by Matt Kugelman and starring fellow Drag Race contestants Bianca Del Rio and Willam Belli. She returned to reprise this role in the 2018 sequel, Hurricane Bianca: From Russia with Hate.

In 2018, she was the commentator for the U.S. for the Eurovision Song Contest held in Lisbon, Portugal with Ross Mathews for Logo TV. The same year, she had a supporting role as a drag queen emcee in the film A Star Is Born, alongside Lady Gaga, Bradley Cooper, and Willam Belli.

On September 8, 2022, Shangela was announced as a contestant on season 31 of Dancing with the Stars. She was partnered with Gleb Savchenko. Shangela and Savchenko reached the finals of the show, and finished in fourth place.

We're Here 
Since 2020, Shangela has co-hosted We're Here on HBO alongside fellow Drag Race contestants Bob the Drag Queen and Eureka O'Hara. In the series, the trio of drag queens travel across the United States to recruit small-town residents to participate in one-night-only drag shows. After premiering on April 23, 2020, the series was renewed for a second season, which premiered on October 11, 2021. In December 2021, the series was renewed for a third season. The series has received acclaim from critics.

Music 
On August 23, 2011, she released her first single "Call Me Laquifa." Her second single, "Werqin' Girl," was released on August 7, 2012. The music video for "Werqin' Girl" features appearances by Abby Lee Miller, Jenifer Lewis, and Yara Sofia. On March 15, 2018, the day of the All Stars 3 finale, Shangela released a new single titled "Pay Me" which features producer Ryan Skyy.

In 2013, Shangela appeared in the music video "Gone With the Wind Fabulous" by Kenya Moore. In 2018, Shangela featured on both the vocals and in the music video for Doll Hairs, a single released by Todrick Hall as part of his Forbidden visual album.

In 2019, singer Ariana Grande featured Shangela's voice on the song "NASA" from her fifth studio album Thank U, Next.

Other ventures 

Shangela is known for the catchphrase, "Halleloo", which the Los Angeles Times considered one of the "2010 Top Terms We Learned on Reality Television." Shangela's comedic persona is Laquifa, who entered the limelight during the eighth episode of season three, in which he won the "Ru Ha Ha" competition. Since being on Drag Race, Shangela has performed comedy as Laquifa in Downelink.com's "One Night Stand Up!" on LOGO. Shangela has performed in the Drag Queens of Comedy showcase alongside legends Lady Bunny, Jackie Beat and Coco Peru, as well as the Werq the World tour alongside several fellow Drag Race alumni, of which she is also the creative director.

Since appearing on Drag Race, Shangela launched "Say What Entertainment", a talent and management agency, in 2014.

Shangela was featured as one of OUT Magazine's "Most Compelling People of 2011".

Pierce has also been active in AIDS awareness and activism. After being featured in a Gilead Sciences ad titled "Red Ribbon Runway" with fellow Drag Race co-stars Carmen Carrera, Delta Work, Manila Luzon and Alexis Mateo, the dress he was featured wearing was auctioned off by Logo in commemoration of World AIDS Day. Proceeds from the auction were donated to the National Association of People with AIDS. On August 14, 2013, Shangela, along with fellow drag queens Detox, Morgan McMichaels, Courtney Act, Willam Belli, and Raven, were featured in the lyric video for Lady Gaga's single "Applause".

In June 2020, Pierce partnered with Actors Fund of America to create "Feed the Queens", a charity dedicated to feeding struggling drag queens who lost work due to the COVID-19 pandemic.

She is one of the most followed queens from Drag Race, and has accumulated over 1.5 million Instagram followers as of October, 2021.

Personal life

Pierce is gay, and is of mixed African-American and Saudi Arabian descent.

RuPaul's Drag Race season-five contestant Alyssa Edwards is Shangela's drag mother.

Pierce has lived in the basement of Jenifer Lewis' poolhouse for over a decade in Los Angeles, California.

Filmography

Film

Television

Music videos

Web series

Discography

Singles

Guest appearances

Awards and nominations

Notes

References

External links

 
 

21st-century American comedians
African-American drag queens
African-American male actors
African-American male comedians
African-American male singers
American comedians of Arab descent
Asian-American drag queens
American gay actors
American male comedians
American male film actors
American male television actors
American people of Saudi Arabian descent
American singers of Asian descent
LGBT African Americans
American LGBT people of Asian descent
LGBT people from Texas
Living people
People from Paris, Texas
Place of birth missing (living people)
RuPaul's Drag Race All Stars contestants
RuPaul's Drag Race contestants
1980 births